Monte Hodges (born November 1, 1971) is an American politician and a Democratic member of the Arkansas House of Representatives representing District 55 since January 14, 2013. He was a candidate for U.S. congress in Arkansas's 1st congressional district in the 2022 United States House of Representatives elections in Arkansas, in which he lost to incumbent Republican Rick Crawford.

Education
Hodges earned his AA from Mississippi County Community College and his bachelor's degree in business administration from Arkansas State University.

Elections
2012 To challenge District 55 incumbent Republican Representative Tommy Baker left the Legislature and left the seat open, Hodges placed first in the May 22, 2012 Democratic Primary with 1,170 votes (38.9%), won the June 22 runoff election with 1,764 votes (56.2%), and was unopposed for the November 6, 2012 General election.

References

External links
Official page at the Arkansas House of Representatives
Monte Hodges for Congress campaign website

1971 births
Living people
African-American state legislators in Arkansas
Arkansas lawyers
Arkansas State University alumni
Candidates in the 2022 United States House of Representatives elections
Democratic Party members of the Arkansas House of Representatives
People from Blytheville, Arkansas
21st-century American politicians
21st-century African-American politicians
20th-century African-American people